David-Weill is a surname. Notable people with the surname include:
David David-Weill (1871-1952), French-American banker
Jean David-Weill (1898-1972), French epigrapher
Michel David-Weill (born 1932), French investment banker
Pierre David-Weill (1900-1975), French investment banker

See also
David (surname)
Weil (surname)

Compound surnames
French-language surnames
Jewish surnames